Alexandre Jacques Chantron (28 January 1842 – 1918) was a French artist from the Western city of Nantes. His early work consisted mainly of portraits and still lives, and later he took to painting nude studies in the manner of Bouguereau, a theme he continued to develop while experimenting with the fledgeling photographic technology of the day.

Chantron was a pupil of François-Édouard Picot, Tony Robert-Fleury and William-Adolphe Bouguereau. He entered the Paris Salon in 1877 with a religious subject, and gained an honorable mention in 1893. He exhibited Fleurs de printemps at the Salon in 1895. He was awarded a third class medal in 1899, and a second class medal in 1902 for his painting Feuilles Mortes.

References

External links
 La Conchiglia di Venere - The Nude in Art History

1842 births
1918 deaths
19th-century French painters
French male painters
20th-century French painters
20th-century French male artists
19th-century French male artists
Academic art